Virginia Nicholson (née Bell) (born 1955) is an English non-fiction author known for her works of women's history in the first half of the twentieth century.  Nicholson was born in Newcastle and grew up in Leeds before becoming a television researcher.

Family 
Her father was the writer and art historian Quentin Bell, nephew of Virginia Woolf; her mother, Anne Olivier Bell, edited Virginia Woolf's diaries. She married writer William Nicholson in 1988.

Selected publications
 Charleston: A Bloomsbury House and Gardens. Frances Lincoln, London, 1997. (With Quentin Bell) 
 Among the Bohemians: Experiments in Living 1900-1939. Viking, London, 2002. 
 Singled Out - How Two Million Women Survived Without Men After the First World War. Viking, 2007. 
 Millions Like Us: Women's Lives During the Second World War. Viking, 2011. 
 Perfect Wives in Ideal Homes: The Story of Women in the 1950s. Viking, 2015.

References

External links

Living people
English non-fiction writers
English women non-fiction writers
Women's historians
1955 births
Alumni of King's College, Cambridge
Writers from Newcastle upon Tyne